The New Caledonia women's national cricket team represents the country of New Caledonia in women's cricket matches.

In April 2018, the International Cricket Council (ICC) granted full Women's Twenty20 International (WT20I) status to all its members. However, as of October 2019 New Caledonia are not members of the ICC.

History 

Cricket was introduced to New Caledonia by English missionaries. It is currently mostly played by women.

See also
 New Caledonia national cricket team

References

Women's
Women's national cricket teams
C